Ute Rührold (later Böhme then Klawonn, born 9 December 1954 in Zerbst, Bezirk Magdeburg) is an East German luger who competed during the 1970s. She won two consecutive silver medals in the women's singles event at Winter Olympics (1972, 1976).

Rührold also won three medals at the FIL World Luge Championships with two silvers (1973, 1975) and one bronze (1974). Additionally, she won a complete set of medals at the FIL European Luge Championships with a gold in 1972, a silver in 1973, and a bronze in 1974.

References
Fuzilogik Sports – Winter Olympic results – Women's luge
Hickoksports.com results on Olympic champions in luge and skeleton.
Hickok sports information on World champions in luge and skeleton.
List of European luge champions 
SportQuick.com information on World champions in luge 

1954 births
Living people
People from Zerbst
People from Bezirk Magdeburg
German female lugers
Sportspeople from Saxony-Anhalt
Olympic lugers of East Germany
Lugers at the 1972 Winter Olympics
Lugers at the 1976 Winter Olympics
Olympic silver medalists for East Germany
Olympic medalists in luge
Medalists at the 1976 Winter Olympics
Medalists at the 1972 Winter Olympics
Recipients of the Patriotic Order of Merit in bronze
20th-century German women